Jean Hénault (25 November 1898 – 14 November 1983) was a Belgian athlete. He competed in the men's high jump at the 1920 Summer Olympics and the 1924 Summer Olympics.

References

1898 births
1983 deaths
Athletes (track and field) at the 1920 Summer Olympics
Athletes (track and field) at the 1924 Summer Olympics
Belgian male high jumpers
Olympic athletes of Belgium
Place of birth missing